Warszawa Gocławek railway station is a railway station in the Wawer district of Warsaw, Poland. As of 2012, it is served by Koleje Mazowieckie, who run the KM7 services from Warszawa Zachodnia to Dęblin and by Szybka Kolej Miejska, who run the S1 services from Pruszków PKP to Otwock.

References
Station article at kolej.one.pl

External links 
 

Goclawek
Railway stations served by Koleje Mazowieckie
Railway stations served by Szybka Kolej Miejska (Warsaw)
Wawer